Total Football is a tactical system in association football in which any outfield player can take over the role of any other player in a team. Although Dutch club Ajax and the Netherlands national football team are generally credited with creating this system during the 1970s, there were other sides who had played a similar style before, such as the Austrian Wunderteam of the 1930s, English club Sunderland in the mid-1930s, the Argentine side "La Maquina" of River Plate in the 1940s, the Golden Team of Hungary in the 1950s, English team Burnley in the late 1950s and early 1960s, and Brazilian side Santos in the 1960s.

In Total Football, a player who moves out of his position is replaced by another from his team, thus retaining the team's intended organisational structure. In this fluid system, no outfield player is fixed in a predetermined role; anyone can successively play as an attacker, a midfielder and a defender. The only player who must stay in a specified position is the goalkeeper.

Total Football's tactical success depends largely on the adaptability of each footballer within the team, in particular the ability to quickly switch positions depending on the on-field situation. The theory requires players to be comfortable in multiple positions; hence, it requires intelligent and technically diverse players.

During the 1970s, Ajax played some of their finest football ever, achieving a perfect home record (46–0–0) for two full seasons (1971–72 and 1972–73), just one defeat in the whole of the 1971–72 season, and celebrating four titles in 1972 (the Netherlands national league, KNVB Cup, European Cup and Intercontinental Cup).

History

Early developments and origins 

The first foundations for Total Football were laid by continental pioneer Jimmy Hogan, a Burnley native. Working with Austrian coach and his friend Hugo Meisl in the early 1930s, Meisl's Austria national football team (known as the "Wunderteam") became possibly the first side to play Total Football. Hogan's influence reached beyond the Austrian borders, as two decades later the Hungarian national team (also known as the "Golden Team") played a similar style of football under coach Gusztáv Sebes. The then president of the Hungarian Football Association, Sandor Barcs, said: "Jimmy Hogan taught us everything we know about football".

Another team who played a similar style as the Austrians, were Torino ("Grande Torino" as the team was called) in the 1940s. Between 1941 and 1947, Argentinian club River Plate formed a remarkable team, known as "La Máquina" (The Machine), whose famous front formed by Carlos Muñoz, José Manuel Moreno, Adolfo Pedernera, Ángel Labruna and Félix Loustau perfected the "false nine" style and the constant change of attack positions. "La Máquina" won several Argentine and international titles.

Also in the 1940s, English manager Jack Reynolds, implemented a Total Football style in Amsterdam's Ajax, leading the Dutch club to rise in importance and win trophies for the first time. In the late 1950s and early 1960s, Burnley were playing a renewed system in English football "where every player could play in every position" under manager Harry Potts. This Total Football system led the club to the 1959–60 First Division title and won many plaudits, including admiration from all-time English First Division top scorer Jimmy Greaves. Another pioneer was Vic Buckingham, manager of West Bromwich Albion, Ajax and Barcelona in the 1950s and 1960s, as his philosophy was later further developed by Rinus Michels and Johan Cruyff, a player who was introduced into the Ajax first team by Buckingham.

Totaalvoetbal schools (1960s–1970s) 

Rinus Michels, who played under Reynolds, later became manager of Ajax in 1965. Michels reworked the theory, with his introduction of forward Johan Cruyff, perhaps the system's most famous exponent. Although Cruyff was fielded as centre forward, Michels encouraged Cruyff to roam freely around the pitch, using technical ability and intelligence to exploit the weaknesses in the opposition and create chances. Cruyff's teammates also worked to adapt themselves accordingly, regularly switching positions to ensure tactical roles in the team were consistently filled. Austrian coach Ernst Happel reworked the theory to introduce strength, encouraging his players to play tougher during his spells at ADO Den Haag and Feyenoord. Happel also managed the Netherlands national team to a runner-up finish in the 1978 FIFA World Cup.

The major component was the use of space, with the need to consistently create space central to the concept of Total Football. Former Ajax defender Barry Hulshoff described it as "[the thing] we discussed the whole time. Cruyff always talked about where to run and where to stand, and when not to move". He further elaborated that position switching was only made possible due to apt spatial awareness. He also described Total Football being proactive, as well as highlighting the use of pressing, which would be used to win back the ball or put the opposition under considerable pressure. Michels and Cruyff saw unprecedented success with the system, winning eight Eredivisie titles, three European Cups, and one Intercontinental Cup. The stark rise of Total Football and its attacking prowess was also linked with the "death of Catenaccio", an Italian system reliant heavily on defence promoted by Internazionale during the 1960s.

The Total Football system was prone to defeat, experienced notably in the final of the 1974 FIFA World Cup contested by the Dutch and West Germany. Michels and Cruyff saw their ability to introduce playmaking stifled in the second half of the match by the effective marking of Berti Vogts. This allowed Franz Beckenbauer, Uli Hoeneß, and Wolfgang Overath to gain a stronghold in midfield, thus, enabling West Germany to win 2–1.

Modern era 

Building further on the foundations of Total Football, a new tactical system developed in FC Barcelona (particularly under manager Josep Guardiola) and the Spain national team during the late 2000s and early 2010s. This came to be known as Juego de Posición or Tiki-taka.

See also 

 Anti-football
 La Máquina
 Golden Team
 Football tactics and skills
 Formation (association football)

References 

Association football tactics
Association football terminology